The Bili-Bili Dam is located in Gowa Regency, South Sulawesi, Indonesia, on the Jeneberang River, about 30 km from the city of Makassar. It serves several purposes to include flood control, irrigation and hydroelectric power generation. The dam was constructed between 1991 and 1998.

Background
In 1981, Bili-Bili Dam was added to the Jeneberang River Comprehensive Development Project. Construction began in 1991 and the dam was completed in 1998. The weirs downstream of the dam and their accompanying irrigation canals were completed in December 2005. The dam's power station was commissioned in 2005 as well. The project was built with funding and cooperation from the Japan International Cooperation Agency. It has several purposes to include municipal water supply for the city of Makassar, about 30 km away, and to protect the city from historic flooding. It is designed prevent an estimated 50-year flood. The power station has an installed capacity of 19.25 MW and generates about 69,000 MWh of electric power each year.

Sedimentation in the reservoir has been a concern since at least 2004. The dam is downstream from Mount Bawakaraeng, which is "prone to landslides." A large landslide in 2004 prompted a request for survey assistance to the Japanese government to determine the possible impact on the dam. 

An overflow of the dam in 2019 caused a major flooding.

Design
Its reservoir holds  of water. Below the dam are three weirs, the Bili-Bili, Bissau and Kampili.

References

External links 

Sedimentation in Bilibili Dam and opportunist rice cropping while the lake is at a low level
River in Bilibili, Gowa, 1
River in Bilibili, Gowa, 2
Bilibili map and satellite images at Maplandia

Dams in Indonesia
Hydroelectric power stations in Indonesia
Dams completed in 1998
Infrastructure in Indonesia
Geography of South Sulawesi
Energy infrastructure completed in 2005
1998 establishments in Indonesia
Reservoirs in Indonesia
Japan International Cooperation Agency